The 2023 AFL draft will consist of the various periods where the 18 clubs in the Australian Football League (AFL) can trade and recruit players during and following the completion of the 2023 AFL season.

Player movements

Previous trades

List changes

Retirements

See also 
 2023 AFL Women's draft

References 

Australian Football League draft
Draft
2020s in Melbourne
Australian rules football in Victoria (Australia)
Sport in Melbourne
Events in Melbourne